The Fort Smith Masonic Temple is a historic building at 200 North 11th Street in Fort Smith, Arkansas.  It is a large stone-walled structure, with styling that is an Art Deco-influenced version of Egyptian Revival architecture.  Its main (northwest-facing) facade has a projecting central section, from which a series of bays are progressively stepped back, unified by a band of decorative carving at the top, just below the flat roof.  The central portion has slightly-projecting pilaster-like sections flanking three recessed bays, which are divided by two fluted pilasters and topped by decorative carved stonework and a panel identifying the building.  The entrance is set in the center bay, recessed under a projecting square frame.  The building was designed by Little Rock architect George R. Mann and completed in 1929.  It is one of the few buildings in Arkansas to exhibit Egyptian Revival styling, which is particularly pronounced in the building's interior decoration.

The building was listed on the National Register of Historic Places in 1992.

Since 2017. It has become a concert venue called "Temple Live" and can seat 1,100 people.

In 2019, the temple has branched to two other locations, one in Wichita, Kansas and the other in Cleveland, Ohio.

See also
National Register of Historic Places listings in Sebastian County, Arkansas

References

Clubhouses on the National Register of Historic Places in Arkansas
Buildings and structures in Fort Smith, Arkansas
Masonic buildings in Arkansas
Art Deco architecture in Arkansas
National Register of Historic Places in Sebastian County, Arkansas
Egyptian Revival architecture in Arkansas
1929 establishments in Arkansas
Cultural infrastructure completed in 1929